The year 1653 in music involved some significant events.

Events 
The Ballet Royal de la Nuit premieres on 23 February, at the Salle du Petit-Bourbon in Paris.
Madeleine de Scudéry and her friend, the lutenist Mlle Bocquet, launch a salon.
 Jean-Baptiste Boësset and Jean-Baptiste Lully start their collaboration to produce ballets de cour (to 1666).
The Bavarian State Opera opera company is founded under Princess Henriette Adelaide of Savoy, performing Giovanni Battista Maccioni's L'arpa festante in the court theatre.

Classical music

Opera 
Antonio Maria Abbatini – Dal male il bene
Antonio Bertali – L'inganno d'amore
Charles Coypeau d'Assoucy – Andromède

Publications 
Alberich Mazak – Cultus harmonicus, volume three, a collection of his complete works, published in Vienna

Births 
February 12 – Giovanni Francesco Grossi, Italian singer (died 1697)
February 17 – Arcangelo Corelli, Italian composer and violinist (died 1713)
June 1 – Georg Muffat, composer (died 1704)
September 1 (baptized) – Johann Pachelbel, German organist and composer (died 1706)

Deaths 
January 14 – George Rudolf of Liegnitz, patron of the arts and amateur composer (born 1595)
February 16 – Johannes Schultz, composer (born 1582)
February 23 – Luigi Rossi, Italian composer of cantatas (born 1597)
March 24 – Samuel Scheidt, German organist and composer (born 1587)

References 

 
17th century in music
Music by year